Conus longilineus is a species of sea snail, a marine gastropod mollusk in the family Conidae, the cone snails and their allies.

Like all species within the genus Conus, these snails are predatory and venomous. They are capable of "stinging" humans, therefore live ones should be handled carefully or not at all.

Description
The shell attains a length of 20 mm.

Distribution
This marine species occurs in the Atlantic Ocean off the Cape Verdes in the following locations in the southern part of the island of Sal:
 Parda
 Sal Island
 Santa Maria
 Serra Negra

References

 Rolán E., 2005. Malacological Fauna From The Cape Verde Archipelago. Part 1, Polyplacophora and Gastropoda.
  Puillandre N., Duda T.F., Meyer C., Olivera B.M. & Bouchet P. (2015). One, four or 100 genera? A new classification of the cone snails. Journal of Molluscan Studies. 81: 1-23

External links
 To Biodiversity Heritage Library (1 publication)
 To GenBank
 To World Register of Marine Species
 

longilineus
Gastropods described in 1980
Fauna of Sal, Cape Verde
Gastropods of Cape Verde